Natham taluk is a taluk of Dindigul district of the Indian state of Tamil Nadu. The headquarters of the taluk is the town of Natham.

Demographics
According to the 2011 census, the taluk of Natham had a population of 158,411 with 79,947 males and 78,464 females. There were 981 women for every 1,000 men. The taluk had a literacy rate of 65.51%. Child population in the age group below 6 years were 8,821 Males and 8,478 Females.

See also 
Kokkal
Uralipatti
>{sambaipatti seemai}<

References 

Taluks of Dindigul district